The prownose skate (Dipturus stenorhynchus) is a species of fish in the family Rajidae. It is found off Mozambique and South Africa. Its natural habitat is open seas.

References

prownose skate
Fish of Mozambique
Marine fish of South Africa
Marine fauna of Southern Africa
prownose skate
Taxonomy articles created by Polbot